"Lookin' for Love" is a song written by Wanda Mallette, Bob Morrison and Patti Ryan, and recorded by American country music singer Johnny Lee. It was released in June 1980 as part of the soundtrack to the film Urban Cowboy, released that year. Marcy Levy was one of the female singers who provided backing vocals on the track. "Lookin' for Love" was reissued as the lead song on his October 1980 album of the same name.

Background
Lee, whose biggest hit to date had been a 1977 cover of Ricky Nelson's "Garden Party", had been the main nightclub act (behind Mickey Gilley himself) at Gilley's, a nightclub owned by Sherwood Cryer and country music superstar Mickey Gilley. Record executive Irving Azoff offered Lee the chance to record "Lookin' For Love", a song that 20-plus artists had rejected.

Critical reaction to the song has been mixed. The Boston Globe called it "a powerful new ballad," noting "Lee's rich southern baritone and thick phrasing." AllMusic determined that "the MOR country-pop of 'Lookin' for Love' is so appealing that one suspects it could have been a hit even without the publicity from Urban Cowboy." Country music historian Bill Malone once noted that "Lookin' for Love" – in his words, a "lilting little pop song" – became the featured song of Urban Cowboy and a huge commercial hit largely because "actor John Travolta (the movie's co-star) expressed a liking for it." Critic Kurt Wolff panned the song as an example of "watered-down cowboy music."

Public reaction was better. "Lookin' for Love" rose to No. 1 (for a three-week stay) on the Billboard Hot Country Singles chart, and was a No. 5 Billboard Hot 100 hit as well. On the US Cash Box Top 100, the song spent two weeks at No. 4. The song is now recognized as a standard in country music, praised by country music fans and critics alike.

"Lookin' for Love" was certified gold in 1980 for shipments of 1,000,000 units by the Recording Industry Association of America.

Charts

Weekly charts

Year-end charts

Series
The song was performed by Johnny Lee in an episode of CHiPs. It could also be heard in two episodes of Dallas, episodes 274 and 275.

Cover versions, parodies and tributes
Country music group Sawyer Brown recorded a cover of the song on the 2000 album The Hits Live. This version peaked at No. 44 on the Billboard Hot Country Singles & Tracks chart.

The song is also featured in the classic Saturday Night Live sketch Buh-Weet Sings, in which Buckwheat from Our Gang (played by Eddie Murphy) sings the song as "Wookin' Pa Nub".

The Star Trek: Deep Space Nine episode "Looking for par'Mach in All the Wrong Places" is titled in tribute to this song ("par'Mach" is defined in the episode as "the Klingon word for love, but with more aggressive overtones").

Al Lowe's second Leisure Suit Larry game, Leisure Suit Larry Goes Looking for Love (in Several Wrong Places), is named after the song.

The song was referenced in Operation Repo in season 11 episode 7.

The Mexican group, Los Felinos, did a Spanish cover, "Buscando Amor."

The song was punned in the January 13, 2020, comic strip Pearls Before Swine.

Old Dominion performed the song at the 54th Annual Country Music Association Awards on November 11, 2020.

The song was used in a 2021 TV commercial for Coors Light.

The song was used in the Star Trek: Strange New Worlds episode "Spock Amok", the fifth episode of the series' first season, on June 2, 2022. It was performed by Kings & Queens.

The song was covered by King Harvest in the album The Prairie Dogs - Country Classics for the soundtrack to OK Buckaroos - The Life, Music, and Good Times of Jerry Jeff Walker in 2010.

The song was used in the promo ads for season 3 of Dave (TV series).

Sources

References

Other sources
[ AllMusic – "Johnny Lee" entry by Tom Roland].
 Roland, Tom, "The Billboard Book of Number One Country Hits," Billboard Books, Watson-Guptill Publications, New York, 1991.
Whitburn, Joel, "Top Country Songs: 1944–2005," 2006.

1980 singles
Johnny Lee (singer) songs
Sawyer Brown songs
Song recordings produced by John Boylan (record producer)
Full Moon Records singles
Curb Records singles
Songs written by Bob Morrison (songwriter)
1980 songs